Marion Leo Hart (born March 3, 1949) is a former American football quarterback in the National Football League. He played for the Atlanta Falcons and Buffalo Bills. He played college football for the Duke Blue Devils. "Leo Hart stands as one of the most decorated football players in Duke History. The strong armed quarterback virtually re-wrote the Duke and ACC record books during his playing days with the Blue Devils."

In 1988 Hart was inducted into Duke Sports Hall of Fame. Hart was inducted into the Kinston/Lenoir County Sports Hall of Fame in 2004. In 2008 he became a member of the North Carolina Sports Hall of Fame.

Early career
Hart went to Grainger High School in Kinston, North Carolina. He played college football at Duke University, where he was a three time All-Atlantic Coast Conference selection 1968-1970. He was selected as a Duke most valuable player 1969-1970 (as a junior and as a senior).  While at Duke, Hart passed for a record 6,116 yards and held an ACC record 487 pass completions. At Duke Leo was a member of Phi Delt fraternity.

NFL career
Hart's NFL Career Stats

Post career
Leo Hart and Dr. Frank Bassett were two pivotal players in spearheading the Duke Football Campaign, which was the fund-raising effort for the Yoh Football Center. Over half of all donations (approximately $8 million) that made the building possible came from former Blue Devil football players. This $22 million complex opened in August 2002.

Personal life
Leo is married to Glenda Brodrick Hart.

References

1949 births
Living people
American football quarterbacks
Atlanta Falcons players
Buffalo Bills players
Duke Blue Devils football players
Players of American football from North Carolina